Trithemis stictica, the Jaunty Dropwing, is a species of dragonfly in the family Libellulidae.

Distribution
It is found in Angola, Botswana, Cameroon, the Democratic Republic of the Congo, Ivory Coast, Ethiopia, Ghana, Guinea, Kenya, Liberia, Madagascar, Malawi, Mozambique, Namibia, Nigeria, Sierra Leone, Somalia, South Africa, Sudan, Tanzania, Uganda, Zambia, Zimbabwe, and possibly Burundi.

Habitat
Its natural habitats are subtropical or tropical moist lowland forests, subtropical or tropical dry shrubland, subtropical or tropical moist shrubland, rivers, intermittent rivers, and freshwater marshes.

Gallery

References

<ref> 2006 IUCN Red List of Threatened Species.   Downloaded on 10 August 2007.

External links

 Text for jaunty dropwing from South African Dragonfly Atlas 

stictica
Taxonomy articles created by Polbot
Insects described in 1839
Taxa named by Hermann Burmeister